As of January 2019, the Singapore Exchange (SGX) has 640 mainboard listings and 215 catalist listings.

Companies are only listed on the Singapore Exchange if they do well.  If their average daily market capitalisation is less than $40 million over the last 120 market days, then it is placed on a watch-list, and if it does not improve within two years it is delisted from the Singapore Exchange. The list here is correct as of 6 December 2020.

SGX mainboard listing

0–9

A

B

C

D

E

F

G

H

I

J

K

L

M

N

O

P

Q

R

S

T

U

V

W

X

Y

Z

Catalist secondary board listing

0–9

A

B

C

D

E

F

G

H

I

J

K

L

M

N

O

P

Q

R

S

T

U

V

W

Y

Z

References

General references

External links 
Official SGX site
Listed companies corporate information
 Current list of SGX Listed Companies in alphabetical order.
 Current list of SGX Listed Companies by Industrial Sectors.

 
Economy of Singapore-related lists

Singapore Exchange
Singapore